Events from the year 1541 in Sweden

Incumbents
 Monarch – Gustav I

Events

 15 September - Peace treaty between Sweden and Denmark for a period of 50 years. 
 - The Gustav Vasa Bible, the first bible in the Swedish language, is printed. 
 - Georg Norman inspect the churches of Småland on commission of the king, and confiscate all the church silver deemed not necessary for church service.

Births

Deaths

References

 
Years of the 16th century in Sweden
Sweden